Elections to Warwickshire County Council took place on 4 June 2009, having been delayed from 7 May, in order to coincide with elections to the European Parliament.

Summary of Results

|}

Divisional Results

North Warwickshire

Nuneaton and Bedworth

Rugby

Stratford upon Avon

Warwick

 Wards marked with a star elect two members

References

2009
2009 English local elections
2000s in Warwickshire